The Reformed Presbyterian Church of Ecuador (RPCE) - in Spanish Iglesia Reformada Presbiteriana del Ecuador - is a Protestant Reformed, founded in Ecuador in 1991, by missionaries of the Presbyterian Church in America.

History 
In 1991, missionaries from the Presbyterian Church in America began planting churches in Quito. From this, several churches emerged, which together constituted the Presbyterian Church of Ecuador (IRPE) in 1995.

However, in 2019, the denomination consisted of 3 churches in Quito and 1 congregation in the Amazon region, after some churches split.

Doctrine 
The denomination subscribes to Westminster Confession of Faith, Westminster Larger Catechism and Westminster Shorter Catechism.

References 

Presbyterian denominations in South America